Isaac Harrison McKaughan House is a historic home located at Kernersville, Forsyth County, North Carolina.  It was built about 1875, and is a two-story, "L"-shaped Italianate style brick farmhouse. It has a central hall plan and two-room rear ell.

It was listed on the National Register of Historic Places in 1988.

References

Houses on the National Register of Historic Places in North Carolina
Italianate architecture in North Carolina
Houses completed in 1875
Houses in Forsyth County, North Carolina
National Register of Historic Places in Forsyth County, North Carolina